Rahmanniyeh Castle is a historical castle located in Bardaskan County in Razavi Khorasan Province, The longevity of this fortress dates back to the 8th to 12th centuries AH.

References 

Castles in Iran